Nagaland Premier League is the top state-level football league in the Indian state of Nagaland. It is managed by Nagaland Football Association (NFA).

Structure
It featured the best 10 teams of Nagaland competing for the trophy. Each club plays other twice (home and away).

At the end of each season the champion club would be nominated for I-League 2nd Division. Since the league is currently inactive, some clubs find solution in joining events of nearby Manipur or Mizoram Football Association.

Clubs
This is the completed club list for the 2014 season.

Winners

See also
Nagaland Football Association

References

External links
 
 

 
4
2012 establishments in Nagaland
Sports leagues established in 2012